Oratory Athenæum for University Preparation is a private, Roman Catholic high school in Pharr, Texas.  It is located in the Roman Catholic Diocese of Brownsville.

Background
The Oratory Athenæum for University Preparation was established in 1998 as an extension of The Pharr Oratory School System of St. Philip Neri, established in 1983 by the Congregation of the Oratory of St. Philip Neri of Pontifical Right of Pharr, Texas.  It was the first Catholic high school in Hidalgo County, Texas.

Mission statement
The mission of the Oratory Schools is to promote the formation of Christian character, Catholic lay leadership, Christian fellowship, and community service by integrating the gospel message with a liberal arts educational program in the spirit of the joy exemplified by its founder, Saint Philip Neri.

School Song

Notes and references

External links
 School Website
 Roman Catholic Diocese of Brownsville

Catholic secondary schools in Texas
High schools in Hidalgo County, Texas
Educational institutions established in 1998
Pharr, Texas
1998 establishments in Texas